George Byers may refer to:

 George Byers (footballer) (born 1996), Scottish footballer for Sheffield Wednesday
 George Byers (canoeist) (1916–1995), American sprint canoer
 George Byers (boxer) (1872–1937), Canadian-American boxer